Onyekachi Donatus Okonkwo (born 13 May 1982 in Aba) is a Nigerian football midfielder.

Club career
Okonkwo was a member of Enyimba's winning side in the 2003 MTN CAF Champions League and 2004 MTN CAF Champions League finals.

During his two-year stay in South Africa he was arguably one of the club's most influential players even scoring the decisive goal against his former club Enyimba to lead the Johannesburg-based club Orlando Pirates to the 2006 MTN CAF Champions League semifinals..

Okonkwo caused a stir in Europe by signing a pre-contract agreement with German side FC Köln only to leave the club a week later to sign a four-year deal at Swiss side FC Zürich saying that he had only ever agreed to a one-week trial at the German team. Despite FC Köln's sporting director Klaus Horstmann threatening to take the matter to FIFA in order for him to fulfil his obligations to his side, Okonkwo says he did not breach any rules in moving to Switzerland. He joined Qatari side Al Kharitiyath in the summer of 2010.

On 26 June 2012 Okonkwo rejoined Orlando Pirates and next year, on 12 July 2013, signed with local rivals Mpumalanga Black Aces.

International 
He won his first international cap for Nigeria in an 2008 Africa Cup of Nations qualifier against Lesotho in October 2006.

Award
 FC Zürich
2008-09 Swiss Super League: Champions

References

External links

1982 births
Living people
Igbo sportspeople
Nigerian footballers
Nigeria international footballers
2008 Africa Cup of Nations players
FC Zürich players
Association football midfielders
Orlando Pirates F.C. players
Enyimba F.C. players
Al Kharaitiyat SC players
Mpumalanga Black Aces F.C. players
Mosta F.C. players
Nuorese Calcio players
Qatar Stars League players
Nigerian expatriate footballers
Expatriate soccer players in South Africa
Nigerian expatriate sportspeople in South Africa
Expatriate footballers in Switzerland
Nigerian expatriate sportspeople in Switzerland
Expatriate footballers in Qatar
Nigerian expatriate sportspeople in Qatar
Expatriate footballers in Malta
Nigerian expatriate sportspeople in Malta
Expatriate footballers in Italy
Nigerian expatriate sportspeople in Italy
People from Aba, Abia